Sean Mosley  (born March 19, 1989) is an American professional basketball player who last played for Hapoel Tel Aviv B.C. of the Israeli Basketball Premier League.

High School career
While in high school Sean was named Player of the Year by the Baltimore Sun at St. Frances Academy. Sean was also named the 2008 Gatorade Player of the Year in Maryland  where he finished his career as the second-leading scorer in Maryland high school basketball with 2,933 points. In his senior season he helped his team win the Baltimore Catholic League championship.

College career
 Sean Mosley  played his entire college career (2008–2012) for the University of Maryland. Sean was team captain during his junior and senior seasons. As a member of the team Sean was in the top 5 in the ACC in 3-point field goal percentage (37%) and free throw percentage (84%). In his senior year he was second in scoring. During his sophomore year he was ranked 4th on the team in scoring and 2nd on the team in rebounding.

Professional career
Mosley entered the 2012 NBA Draft but was not selected. On October 23, 2014 he signed with the Crailsheim Merlinsin the German Basketball League after playing for SKK Kotwica Kołobrzeg of the Polish Basketball League. On August 6, 2015 he signed to Hapoel Tel Aviv for the 2015–16 season after competing for Crailsheim Merlins for the 2014–15 season.

References

1989 births
Living people
American expatriate basketball people in Germany
American expatriate basketball people in Israel
American expatriate basketball people in Poland
Basketball players from Baltimore
Hapoel Tel Aviv B.C. players
Maryland Terrapins men's basketball players
Shooting guards
American men's basketball players